Arıköy can refer to:

 Arıköy, Dazkırı
 Arıköy, Dicle
 Arıköy, Silvan